Samuel Wardwell (May 16, 1643 – September 22, 1692) was a man accused of witchcraft during the Salem witch trials of 1692. He was executed by hanging on September 22, 1692, along with Alice Parker, Martha Corey, Mary Eastey, Ann Pudeator, Mary Parker, Wilmot Redd, and Margaret Scott.

Biography
Wardwell was born on May 16, 1643, to Thomas Wardwell and Elizabeth Woodruff in Boston, Massachusetts. His father had been a follower of John Wheelwright and Anne Hutchinson. Wardwell had a son out of wedlock, Thomas Wardwell, with Mercy Playfer (Bridget Bishop's sister.) Samuel's son later adapted the last name Tailer when the Wardwells were convicted of witchcraft.

Samuel's wife, Sarah, controlled a one hundred and eighty-eight-acre estate, which she had inherited from her first husband, Adam Hawkes, upon his death. The Province of Massachusetts Bay passed a law which provided attainder for "conjuration, witchcraft, and dealing with evil and wicked spirits", which meant the loss of civil, inheritance, and property rights of those accused.

William Baker Jr., 14 years old, accused the Wardwell family of witchcraft. The accusation targeted Samuel, Sarah, and their 19-year-old daughter Mercy Wardwell (named after her father's first love and the mother of her half brother, Thomas). All three confessed the very day they were interrogated.

Samuel was executed at Proctor's Ledge in Salem after retracting a forced confession. Eventually his widow, Sarah Wardwell, was reprieved and released. In 1712, after Sarah died, their son, Samuel Wardwell Jr., was left destitute and later sued the Colony, winning some compensation for the family's ordeals.

Per the TV show Who Do You Think You Are?, actor Scott Foley is a direct descendant of Samuel Wardwell.

References

Further reading
 Upham, Charles (1980). Salem Witchcraft. New York: Frederick Ungar Publishing Co., 2 vv., v. 2 pp. 324, 384, 480.

1643 births
1692 deaths
17th-century executions of American people
17th-century executions by England
Executed people from Maryland
People convicted of witchcraft
People executed by Massachusetts by hanging
People executed by the Thirteen Colonies by hanging
People executed by the Province of Massachusetts Bay
People from Boston
People of the Salem witch trials